Steven Neil Handel (born January 29, 1945, in Brooklyn) is an American educator and restoration ecologist. Handel is currently Distinguished Professor of Ecology at Rutgers University and Visiting Professor at the Harvard University Graduate School of Design.

Career
A native of Brooklyn, Handel received a Bachelor of Arts in Biological Sciences from Columbia University (1969) and a Master's degree (1974) and Doctor of Philosophy (1976) in Ecology and Evolutionary Biology from Cornell University.

Handel began his professorial career as a biology professor at the University of South Carolina, Yale University—where he also held the post of director of the Marsh Botanical Garden—and Rutgers University. In 1996, he was promoted by Rutgers to a full professor of ecology and was named director of their Center for Urban Restoration Ecology.

Handel was the lead ecologist for the restoration of Orange County Great Park in Irvine, California, and his other projects include Brooklyn Bridge Park, and the landscape for the 2008 Summer Olympics in Beijing, China.

Awards
 2009 - American Society of Landscape Architects Honor Research Award
 2011 - Society for Ecological Restoration Theodore M. Sperry Award
 2015 - American Society of Landscape Architects Honor Communications Award

References

External links
 Rutgers profile

1945 births
Living people
People from Brooklyn
Columbia College (New York) alumni
Cornell University College of Agriculture and Life Sciences alumni
American ecologists
American environmentalists
University of South Carolina faculty
Yale University faculty
Rutgers University faculty
Harvard Graduate School of Design faculty
University of California, Irvine faculty
Academic staff of Macquarie University
University of Virginia faculty
Academic staff of Stockholm University